Leukocyte elastase inhibitor (LEI) also known as serpin B1 is a protein that in humans is encoded by the SERPINB1 gene. It is a member of the clade B serpins or ov-serpins (ovalbumin related serpins) founded by ovalbumin.

MNEI (monocyte/neutrophil elastase inhibitor) is the mouse orthologue of human SerpinB1.

Function 
SerpinB1 is a cytoplasmic serine protease inhibitor of  polymorphonuclear neutrophils. Among other serine proteases, it specifically inhibits  neutrophil elastase, PR3 and cathepsin G, all found in neutrophil granules, by a suicide inhibition mechanism. SerpinB1 was found to reduce tissue damage caused by the mentioned proteases during inflammation and has a role in neutrophil homeostasis in mice. In various infection models (e.g. pneumonia) correlation of SerpinB1 absence and lack of microbial clearance have been shown. Different knockout strains serve as model to investigate the role of SerpinB1 in vivo.

See also
 Serpin

References

Further reading

External links
 The MEROPS online database for peptidases and their inhibitors: I04.006
 

Serine protease inhibitors